Kerdil (also Romanized as Kerdīl and Kardīl) is a village in Efzar Rural District, Efzar District, Qir and Karzin County, Fars Province, Iran. At the 2006 census, its population was 451, in 91 families.

References 

Populated places in Qir and Karzin County